Romizi is a surname. Notable people with the surname include:

Andrea Romizi (born 1979), Italian politician
Marco Romizi (born 1990), Italian footballer

Italian-language surnames